Lee Cataldi (born 1942) is a contemporary Australian poet and linguist.

Biography
Cataldi was born in Sydney during World War II when, owing to her Italian heritage, she  was technically an 'enemy alien'. As a child she lived in Hobart, moving back to Sydney for university. Cataldi has worked as a teacher and a linguist, on Indigenous Australian languages in Halls Creek, Alice Springs and Balgo. In the late sixties she travelled to Italy and England where she became a socialist, inspired by the May 1968 uprising in France.

Cataldi's first book of poems, Invitation to a Marxist lesbian party, was published in 1978, winning the Anne Elder Memorial Prize in that year. Women who live on the ground (1990) received the Human Rights and Equal Opportunity Commission Poetry Award; it was also short-listed for the New South Wales Premier's Literary Awards. Race against time (1998) won the 1999 Kenneth Slessor Prize for Poetry.

In 1998 Cataldi travelled to Madras, India, for an Asialink Literature Residency.

She currently lives in South Australia.

Bibliography

Poetry
 Invitation to a Marxist lesbian party, Wild & Woolley, 1978.
 Women who live on the ground: Poems, 1978-1988, Penguin Australia, 1990.
 Race against time: Poems, Penguin Australia, 1998.

Non-fiction
 Warlpiri Dreamings and Histories: Newly Recorded Stories from the Aboriginal Elders of Central Australia. Coll. and trans. with Peggy Rockman Napaljarri, Schwartz, 2003.

References

Further reading
 Spurr, Barry 1994. The poetry of Lee Cataldi.

External links 
 6 poems at Thylazine

1942 births
Living people
Linguists from Australia
Australian people of Italian descent
Australian women poets
Writers from Sydney
Lesbian poets
Australian LGBT poets
Australian social scientists